Joseph Brian Gullett (born March 27, 1980) is an American politician who is a Georgia State Representative, currently representing the 19th District.  He was elected in 2018 and was sworn into office on January 14, 2019.  He currently serves as Vice Chairman of Energy, Utilities, and Telecommunications committee, Vice Chairman of Code Revision, Secretary of Governmental Affairs, member of Insurance, member of Appropriations, member of Interstate Cooperation, and member of Juvenile Justice.

Election
Gullett defeated the long term incumbent Paulette Rakestraw in a Republican party runoff in July 2018. He was endorsed by the Paulding County sheriff.

Legislation
In 2019, Gullett proposed legislation which would prevent railroad companies from blocking train crossings for long periods of time.

In 2021, Gullett was the lead sponsor for legislation that restricts local Governments from fining alarm companies for false alarms when the false alarms were not the fault of the company.

Gullett also was the lead sponsor on legislation that would restrict local boards of elections from accepting private money.  Ultimately, this was embedded in the Election Integrity Act of 2021.

In addition, Gullett sponsored a bill that would allow Remote Online Notary in Georgia as well as legislation that would create an oversight commission for District Attorneys across the state.

References 

Republican Party members of the Georgia House of Representatives
Living people
21st-century American politicians
1980 births